Papaver arenarium is a species of flowering plant in the family Papaveraceae, native to the Caucasus and Caspian regions. It and Papaver bracteatum deviate from the usual morphine-producing pathway typically used by other members of Papaver, with, for example, P.arenarium producing N-demethylcodeine at the step that P.somniferum produces morphine.

References

arenarium
Flora of Turkey
Flora of the Caucasus
Flora of Kazakhstan
Flora of Turkmenistan
Flora of South European Russia
Flora of Iraq
Flora of Iran
Plants described in 1819